The discography of +44, an American alternative rock supergroup, consists of one studio album, four singles, three demos and three music videos.

Albums

Studio albums

Singles

A^ Released exclusively in the UK.

Compilation appearances

Promotional CDs/7"s

Music videos

Digital download
iTunes Foreign Exchange – cover of Wir sind Helden's song "Guten Tag"
AOL Sessions EP – iTunes only EP featuring live performances
"Lycanthrope" – offered as downloadable content for Guitar Hero World Tour

Remixes
"When Your Heart Stops Beating" (Electronic remix)
"Little Death" (Chris Holmes mix)

Demos
 "145" ("155" acoustic)
 "No It Isn't" (with Carol Heller)
 "Cliffdiving" (instrumental)

References

Discographies of American artists
Pop punk group discographies